Cansın Hacıbekiroğlu (born 12 July 1987) is a Turkish male volleyball player. He is part of the Turkey men's national volleyball team. On club level he plays for Galatasaray.

External links
Player profile at Volleybox.net

1987 births
Living people
Turkish men's volleyball players
Galatasaray S.K. (men's volleyball) players
Polis Akademisi volleyballers
Çankaya Belediyesi volleyballers
21st-century Turkish people